Angelo Fulgini (born 20 August 1996) is a French professional footballer who plays as a midfielder for  club Lens on loan from the German club Mainz 05. He has represented the France national youth teams up to the U21 level.

Club career

Valenciennes
Fulgini started his career at Valenciennes, originally playing for their B team, however in 2015 he was promoted to the first team after a string of good performances.

Angers
In 2017, he signed for Angers for a fee of €1.4 million.

Mainz 05
On 12 July 2022, Mainz 05 announced the signing of Fulgini on four-year deal, for an undisclosed fee.

Lens
On 1 February 2023, Fulgini signed with Lens on an initial loan. Lens holds an obligation to purchase his rights permanently at the end of the loan term. For his second appearance with Lens on 9 February, he scored his first goal against Lorient in Coupe de France. He scored his first Ligue 1 goal with Lens on 25 February 2023 against Montpellier.

Personal life
Fulgini was born in Ivory Coast to an Italian father, and a New Caledonian mother.

References

External links

 
 
 

1996 births
French people of Italian descent
French people of New Caledonian descent
Ivorian people of Italian descent
Ivorian people of French descent
Ivorian people of New Caledonian descent
Footballers from Abidjan
Sportspeople from Var (department)
Sportspeople from Nord (French department)
Footballers from Provence-Alpes-Côte d'Azur
Footballers from Hauts-de-France
Living people
French footballers
Ivorian footballers
Association football midfielders
France youth international footballers
France under-21 international footballers
SC Douai players
Valenciennes FC players
Angers SCO players
1. FSV Mainz 05 players
RC Lens players
Ligue 2 players
Ligue 1 players
Bundesliga players
French expatriate footballers
French expatriate sportspeople in Germany
Expatriate footballers in Germany